Kenneth Arnold Exel (September 12, 1920 – July 7, 2006) was an American professional basketball player. He played for the Oshkosh All-Stars, Syracuse Nationals, and Minneapolis Lakers in the National Basketball League during the 1940s.  For his career he averaged 1.8 points per game.

References

1920 births
2006 deaths
American men's basketball players
United States Navy personnel of World War II
Guards (basketball)
High school baseball coaches in the United States
High school basketball coaches in the United States
Minneapolis Lakers players
Minnesota Golden Gophers men's basketball players
Oshkosh All-Stars players
Basketball players from Minneapolis
Syracuse Nationals players
Roosevelt High School (Minnesota) alumni
Sports coaches from Minneapolis